Korean Oriental Pharmacists (Han-Yak-Sa, Hangul: 한약사, Hanja: 韓藥師) are a licensed healthcare professionals who take charge of various pharmaceutical affairs like the manufacturing, preparation, identification, storage, importation, sales of drugs and other pharmaceutical technologies in the Republic of Korea.

Korean Oriental Pharmacists practice pharmacy and sell medical & pharmaceutical products including over-the-counter drugs and work on oriental medication. Also, some of them work at pharmaceutical companies and government agencies such as Ministry of Food and Drug Safety, controlling the whole drug manufacturing process along with public health administration.

Korean Oriental Pharmacists are placed on the middle ground between oriental medical doctors and general pharmacists. So Korean Oriental Pharmacists can prepare(dispense) oriental medicine in addition to the jobs of general pharmacists such as running pharmacy and various pharmaceutical affairs.

In order to become a licensed Korean Oriental Pharmacist, one has to pass a few nationwide Oriental Pharmacist Licensure Examination administered by the government of the Republic of Korea. They must major in Oriental Pharmacy at the undergraduate level of pharmacy school of university to qualify for these exams. They are also required to take the minimum 160 credits; 70 credits of pharmacy and oriental medicine each. As a result, they can become eligible to take the exams after meeting these academic requirements.

See also 

 Pharmacy
 Pharmacist
 Apothecary
 Pharmacology
 Pharmacognosy
 Herbalist

References 
 National Korean Oriental Pharmacists Union
 National Health Personnel Licensing Examination Board

Traditional Korean medicine
South Korean pharmacists